Donald Collins (born November 28, 1958) is an American former professional basketball player.  Collins was drafted by the Atlanta Hawks, in the first round (18th pick), of the 1980 NBA draft.  Collins played in 303 National Basketball Association (NBA) games for four teams, over six seasons, averaging just under 10 points per game for his career.

College career
Collins, a 6'6" tall Scott High School standout, was selected as the Pac-10 Player of the Year, after averaging 23 points per game for Washington State University, in 1980 and leading the Cougars to their first NCAA Tournament berth since 1941. In a 2011 story, Cougfan.com recounted Collins' sterling career at Washington State and made the case that he is the greatest player in school history.

USBL and CBA
Collins starred in basketball minor leagues, averaging more than 30 points per game, in the United States Basketball League (USBL). A member of the Continental Basketball Association (CBA's) 50th Anniversary Team, Collins is regarded as one of the most prolific scorers in the history of minor league basketball.

Collins had two 63-point scoring games in the minor leagues, both in 1986: In the CBA, as a member of the Baltimore Lightning, against the Detroit Spirits; and in the USBL, as a member of the Tampa Bay Flash, against the Jersey Jammers.

That same year, as a member of the Tampa Bay Thrillers, Collins earned MVP honors at the CBA All-Star Game. Collins and head coach Bill Musselman, led the Thrillers to three consecutive CBA titles.

Professional career
Collins also spent several seasons playing professionally overseas, in France for CSP Limoges and Rupella La Rochelle, and in Switzerland, for Pully and Cossonay.

NBA career statistics

Regular season

|-
| align="left" | 1980–81
| align="left" | Atlanta
| 47 || - || 25.2 || .434 || .000 || .846 || 4.0 || 2.4 || 1.5 || 0.2 || 12.7
|-
| align="left" | 1980–81
| align="left" | Washington
| 34 || - || 19.4 || .463 || .000 || .673 || 2.4 || 2.2 || 1.0 || 0.4 || 9.8
|-
| align="left" | 1981–82
| align="left" | Washington
| 79 || 18 || 20.4 || .511 || .083 || .716 || 2.5 || 1.9 || 1.1 || 0.3 || 10.0
|-
| align="left" | 1982–83
| align="left" | Washington
| 65 || 21 || 24.2 || .523 || .000 || .743 || 3.2 || 2.0 || 1.3 || 0.5 || 11.8
|-
| align="left" | 1983–84
| align="left" | Golden State
| 61 || 6 || 15.7 || .483 || .200 || .730 || 2.1 || 1.1 || 0.7 || 0.2 || 7.2
|-
| align="left" | 1984–85
| align="left" | Washington
| 11 || 0 || 8.3 || .353 || .000 || .889 || 1.7 || 0.6 || 0.6 || 0.4 || 2.9
|-
| align="left" | 1986–87
| align="left" | Milwaukee
| 6 || 0 || 9.5 || .357 || .000 || .714 || 2.5 || 0.3 || 0.3 || 0.2 || 4.2
|- class="sortbottom"
| style="text-align:center;" colspan="2"| Career
| 303 || 45 || 20.2 || .485 || .069 || .749 || 2.8 || 1.8 || 1.1 || 0.3 || 9.8
|}

Playoffs

|-
| align="left" | 1981–82
| align="left" | Washington
| 7 || - || 21.3 || .432 || - || .714 || 3.1 || 0.9 || 0.6 || 0.1 || 6.1
|-
| align="left" | 1984–85
| align="left" | Washington
| 1 || 0 || 2.0 || .000 || .000 || .000 || 0.0 || 0.0 || 0.0 || 0.0 || 0.0
|- class="sortbottom"
| style="text-align:center;" colspan="2"| Career
| 8 || 0 || 18.9 || .432 || .000 || .714 || 2.8 || 0.8 || 0.5 || 0.1 || 5.4
|}

References

External links
 Don-Collins.fr

1958 births
Living people
All-American college men's basketball players
American expatriate basketball people in France
American men's basketball players
Atlanta Hawks draft picks
Atlanta Hawks players
Baltimore Lightning players
Basketball players from Ohio
Golden State Warriors players
Lancaster Lightning players
Limoges CSP players
Milwaukee Bucks players
Rapid City Thrillers players
Sportspeople from Toledo, Ohio
Tampa Bay Thrillers players
Washington Bullets players
Washington State Cougars men's basketball players
Small forwards
Shooting guards
United States Basketball League players
American expatriate basketball people in the Philippines
Philippine Basketball Association imports
San Miguel Beermen players